Paulo Menezes (born 24 March 1978) is a Portuguese football manager and the head coach of Lebanese club Nejmeh

Playing career
Menezes started his playing career in 1996 and spent all of it playing in the Portuguese second and third divisions.

Coaching career

Aizawl: 2017–2018
On 30 July 2017 it was announced that Menezes would take over as head coach of I-League side Aizawl. He coached his first game for the club on 28 November 2017 against East Bengal. Two late goals from Aizawl saw Menezes' side come back and draw the match 2–2.

Mohammedan :2020-Present

Statistics

Managerial statistics
.

Honours

Manager
Aizawl
Mizoram Premier League (1) : 2017-18

References

External links
 Aizawl look to make a strong comeback.
 FootballDatabase Profile.

1978 births
Living people
Portuguese football managers
Aizawl FC managers
Nejmeh SC managers
I-League managers
Lebanese Premier League managers
Portuguese expatriate football managers
Portuguese expatriate sportspeople in India
Portuguese expatriate sportspeople in Lebanon
Expatriate football managers in India
Expatriate football managers in Lebanon